Kristianstad County was a county of Sweden from 1719 to 31 December 1996 when it was merged with Malmöhus County to form Skåne County.

The seat of residence for the Governor was in Kristianstad.

See also
 List of governors of Kristianstad County
 List of governors of Malmöhus County
 List of governors of Skåne County
 County Administrative Boards of Sweden

Former counties of Sweden
History of Skåne County
Former counties of Scania
1719 establishments in Sweden
1996 disestablishments in Sweden